= Congregational prayer =

Congregational prayer may refer to:

- A collective prayer during a church service in Christianity.
- The collective Friday prayer in Islam.
